In late 2020, the appearance of a series of metal columns was reported internationally. Referred to as "monoliths", these sheet metal structures began to be constructed in the wake of the discovery of the Utah monolith, a -tall pillar made of metal sheets riveted into a triangular prism, placed in a red sandstone slot canyon in northern San Juan County, Utah. The structure was placed there sometime between July and October 2016 based on images from Google Earth, but only attracted media attention after it was reported in late November 2020 by state biologists who discovered it during a helicopter survey of wild bighorn sheep.

Soon after the Utah discovery on November 18, 2020, reports emerged on social media of similar metal columns being found in many other places throughout the world, including locations across North America, South America, Central America and Europe. Over two hundred similar metal columns have been reported from various locations around the world.

The origins of these structures varied; some monoliths were made by artists inspired by news coverage of the original Utah pillar; others, like the two Pittsburgh monoliths, were made by local businesses for promotional purposes. Some monoliths were subsequently removed. Despite the word monolith referring to a single great stone, these sculptures were mostly made from metal, and the name derives from the Monolith that appeared in the 1968 science fiction film, 2001: A Space Odyssey. This connection gave rise to speculation about an extraterrestrial origin, although the phenomenon has also been viewed as a craze or an Internet hoax, with a number of features in common with crop circles.

List by location

Since November 2020, monoliths similar to the one found in Utah have been reported internationally.

Asia

India
On 29 December 2020, a monolith appeared at Symphony Forest Park in Ahmedabad, Gujarat. One of the panels features etched numbers, relating to longitudes and latitudes of wildlife parks in India. The anonymous artist said in an interview that "The monolith is shrouded in mystery around the world because people enjoy the mystery of unlocking new ideas and unlocking new thoughts. And this was my contribution to that – engagement of thinking." It disappeared on 13 January leaving a metallic sphere in its place.

India's second Monolith was seen at Jogger's Park in the suburb of Bandra in Mumbai on 10 March 2021. After two weeks it disappeared and was replaced with a metallic sphere much like the one in Ahmedabad.

Africa

Democratic Republic of the Congo 
On February 17, 2021, a monolith was found at a roundabout in the Democratic Republic of Congo's capital Kinshasa. The monolith was burned down by locals who got agitated by its sudden appearance.

Morocco 
On December 10, 2020, a monolith was reported in a construction site in Zenata near Casablanca. Upon investigation, it was determined that the structure was installed by the chemicals and logistics company "Top Negoce" as part of a communication campaign for its new robot "Aya", made in partnership with a Silicon Valley company, and that the robot in question is reportedly trapped inside the structure.

Europe

Austria 
On December 6, 2020, a monolith appeared in Katschberg, near the B99 road, It disappeared shortly after.

On December 10, 2020, the same monolith previously seen in Katschberg was spotted on a golf course, in the district of Tamsweg, Salzburg.

On December 14, 2020, another monolith was found on a field in Peuerbach in Upper Austria.

On January 16, 2021, a new monolith was found in Nauders.

On February 7, 2021, another monolith was found in St. Gertraudi. It is mentioned that curiously, the monolith appeared in the middle of a snowy field, without any tracks in the snow around it.

Belgium 
On December 8, 2020, a monolith structure was discovered near the town of Baasrode,  East Flanders, Belgium.

On December 10, 2020,  discovered in Kanne in the province of Limburg, this one was significantly smaller than the other ones.

On December 29, 2020, another monolith was discovered in Maaseik in the province of Limburg, Unique to this appearance is that it also has a Latin saying: 'Fortis in unum' which means 'as one we are strong'.

Czech Republic 
On December 12, 2020 a monolith was discovered between town Otrokovice and village called Tečovice in the district of Zlín In the middle of a field. This piece is very precisely made.

Finland 

On December 10, 2020, a "mysterious monolith" was discovered in Kyrönniemi recreation area in Savonlinna.

On December 12, 2020, another mysterious monolith was discovered in Finland. Similar to the other monoliths in shape and size, this one was found standing in the middle of a protected field in the small town of Virrat.

On December 18, 2020, A mystical monolith was found in the field between Riihimäki and Hyvinkää. The local newspaper made the news about it Local News

On January 6, 2021, a monolith was discovered at the intersection of Kirkkotie and Järventaustantie in Nurmijärvi, about 30 kilometers north of Helsinki.

On January 19, 2021, a monolith was discovered at the Neuvoton neighborhood in Hamina, a town near the city of Kotka.

France 
On December 5, 2020, a monolith was discovered outside the town of Exireuil in the Deux-Sèvres Department. Local artisan welder Ludovic Liaigre later revealed himself to be the creator.

On December 9, 2020, a monolith was found in Le Havre, Normandy. It was later revealed to be an installation of Peppergraphik, a local company.

On December 9, 2020, a monolith was found in Toulouse, Haute-Garonne. It was revealed to be an installation of the Bricks festival's association a local music festival.

On December 19, 2020, a monolith appeared near Ambialet in the Tarn Department.

Germany

On December 5, 2020, a "monolith-like" pillar was discovered on a field near Sulzbach, Hesse. The pillar is made out of aluminum and has a wooden construction underneath.

On December 10, 2020, a square monolith was discovered in Hohenschwangau, Bavaria. It was found near the well known Neuschwanstein Castle.

On December 11, 2020, a square monolith was discovered near Rostock, Mecklenburg-Vorpommern.

On December 12, 2020, a monolith was discovered in Hamburg. The monolith was taken down by local police, put back into place a few hours later, but disappeared again.

On December 12 or 13, 2020, a monolith was discovered on the shore of Sorpe Dam and removed on 14 December by the ruhrverband.

On December 13, 2020, a monolith was discovered in the district of Gemen in Borken, North Rhine-Westphalia outside of Gemen Castle. This monolith seems to have the same mirrorlike qualities as the British one on the Isle of Wight. It appeared close to a religious educational center for the young.

On December 14, 2020, a black monolith was discovered next to a daycare center in Pohlheim.

On December 14, 2020, a monolith appeared in Hessigheimer Felsengärten in Hessigheim.

On December 16, 2020, a monolith was reported in Bad Staffelstein.

On December 22, 2020, a monolith was spotted in the municipality of Heuchelheim in central Hesse.

Hungary 
On December 11, 2020, a "monolith-like" pillar was discovered on a field in Újpalota in the district of Budapest. The pillar is hollow, with a metal frame. The hosts of the Hungarian YouTube channel Pamkutya claimed to have constructed it, after the pillar was vandalized and they removed it.

Italy
On December 3, 2020, a monolith appeared in the area of Villa Sforza Cesarini, Lanuvio in the province of Rome. Unlike other monoliths, on both sides of the structure there is incomprehensible writing. On December 8, investigators identified the people behind the installation, a group of artists from Castelli Romani in the Metropolitan City of Rome. The artists have not been charged and the monolith remains in place.

On December 6, 2020, a monolith was found in the town center of Ferrara. Its makers sent a note to local journalists claiming it was built by the X-Files character Fox Moulder.

On the first weekend of December 2020, another monolith was discovered in a vineyard near Neumarkt/Egna in South Tyrol/Alto Adige.

On December 12, 2020, another monolith was discovered in Vigolo Vattaro in the province of Trentino.

On December 24, 2020, a monolith was discovered in Aquileia Friuli-Venezia Giulia.

Netherlands
On December 6, 2020, a "monolith-like" pillar was discovered on a nature reserve near Oudehorne, drawing comparison to the Utah object.

On December 8, 2020, a monolith was discovered in Beneden-Leeuwen in the province of Gelderland. It was removed at the request of a citizen, since it was too close to her house. After this a pillar, which may or may not have been the same, appeared again in the street not far away on December 9, 2020, right in front of a restaurant called Meraqi. As of December 15, the monolith is still there.

On December 11, 2020, a monolith was discovered in Oosterhout, on the terrain of the Galvanitas factory.

On December 16, 2020, late in the evening, two men in black with a van were sighted digging a monolith in the center of a roundabout in Kampen. On December 19 it was gone.

Norway
On December 7, 2020, a monolith appeared outside of a lighting store in Kristiansand. Whilst reviewing CCTV footage the video appears to cut at the time monolith appeared. The store denies any involvement.

Poland
On December 9, 2020, a steel monolith was discovered at Kadzielnia nature reserve in Kielce and has since been fenced off with tape due to a possible increase of radiation in the area. On the same day, a second monolith was found by passing runners in Warsaw near the Świętokrzyski Bridge. The city denied any involvement.

On December 14, 2020, the satirical magazine ASZdziennik claimed to have constructed and placed the Warsaw monolith as a symbolic farewell to the year 2020.

Romania
On November 26, 2020, a monolith was discovered in Romania on Bâtca Doamnei Hill in the city of Piatra Neamț, near the historical Petrodava Dacian Fortress. The monolith was found on private property and was quoted as having been placed there "illegally". The case is currently under investigation. Jurnal FM stated on November 27 that they had actually "received a mail containing a clip and some photos regarding a strange structure found on a hill", on the preceding Tuesday, notably prior to the disappearance of the Utah monolith. The clip points out the structure's similarity to the Utah monolith, while also highlighting major differences in its reflective properties and texture. On November 29, Jurnal FM published an update that the monolith from Romania had also disappeared, mentioning that a "bright light" had been reported, though it did not provide a specific source for that report. "Locals thought the light came from a car, but the light pointed towards the sky. In the morning the place where the monolith stood erect was empty, only a faint imprint remains on the ground covered by snow."

On December 1, 2020, a local newspaper, Ziar Piatra Neamț, confirmed to Reuters that the Romanian monolith had disappeared. The paper made the additional claim that a "bad local welder" had "apparently" made the item, though that person's identity remains unknown.

On December 8, 2020, a second Romanian monolith appeared in Vadu, on the shore of the Black Sea.

Slovakia 
On December 14, 2020, 2 monoliths were discovered, one at a shopping center in Senec and the other in the city center of Ružomberok.

Slovenia 
On December 4, 2020, a black-colored monolith appeared in Prlekija.

On December 10, 2020, a monolith was discovered in the center of Zagorje ob Savi.

Spain 
On December 8, 2020, a monolith structure was discovered near the town of Ayllón, Spain. The local council advised that no one approach the area due to the dangerous landscape. A few hours later, the monolith was removed; the mayor of Ayllón described the incident as a "joke made by villagers".

On December 21, 2020, another monolith structure was discovered in Tribaldos, in the province of Cuenca.

On March 30, 2021, another monolith structure was discovered in Castell-Platja d'Aro & S'Agaró, in the province of Girona.

Sweden 
On December 9, 2020, a monolith was discovered outside the city of Arboga.

On December 15, 2020, a monolith was discovered outside the city of Värnamo.

On December 15, 2020, a monolith was discovered outside the city of Katrineholm.

On December 18, 2020, a monolith was discovered at lake Vättern in Huskvarna.

On December 21, 2020, a monolith was discovered in Gotland near the town of Visby.

Switzerland 
On December 9, 2020, a monolith was discovered outside Liebegg Castle in the municipality of Gränichen.

Turkey 
On February 5, 2021, a monolith was discovered in Göbekli Tepe. Although the design was similar, it had text written in Old Turkic script saying "If you want to see the moon, look up to sky".

United Kingdom 
On December 6, 2020, a reflective monolith was found on Compton Beach on the Isle of Wight. This monolith, unlike other installations, was not made of metal, but rather from a wooden plinth covered in mirrored plastic. Two days later on December 8, it was claimed by local designer Tom Dunford.  The monolith sold for £810 via online auction with 53 bids, with the proceeds going to charity.

On December 9, 2020, a similar monolith was discovered on the peak of Glastonbury Tor, outside the town of Glastonbury, Somerset. This monolith had the words "Not Banksy" printed across its face and a stylized caricature of a rat at its base. It was removed by the National Trust the same day. The same day, another monolith was spotted on top of a hill on Dartmoor near the village of Throwleigh.

On December 11, 2020, three monoliths were spotted: in Croydon, southern Greater London, at a primary school in St Albans, Hertfordshire, and in Lerwick, Shetland. The Hertfordshire monolith disappeared again after one day, and was part of a writing experiment for the pupils according to Kevin Byrne, the premises manager of the school, in a phonecall with a Dutch investigator on December 21.

On January 1, 2021, three new monoliths were sighted. One was positioned just outside of Salisbury, Wiltshire. When it was found by the ITV cameraman John Scammell, the words "Happy New Year" followed by an X symbol had been drawn onto the frost on the monolith, as well as a section of the frost that had been rubbed away to reveal the metallic material it was constructed from. Whether the message was written by the creator(s) of the monolith, or a visitor to it, is currently unconfirmed. On 3 January the Salisbury monolith was found to have been vandalized. It was damaged beyond repair and had to be removed from its position on the Laverstock Downs. The second monolith appeared in Sheldon, Birmingham, UK. The third monolith (appropriately for the Steel City, made of stainless steel) appeared on Parkwood Springs in Sheffield. The Sheffield monolith disappeared by the 3rd January, as mysteriously as it appeared. On January 24, 2021, a new monolith was found in the dunes on Hightown beach Merseyside.

Ukraine
On December 10, 2020, a monolith was discovered in Ukraine on top of the Zamkova Hora Hill in the city of Kyiv, near the historical Podil district of Ukraine's capital.

On December 10, 2020, another monolith was found outside the city of Poltava in the middle of Makukhiv's landfill.

North America

Canada

Alberta 
On December 13, 2020 a monolith was discovered in Lethbridge.

On January 7, 2021 a monolith was discovered in Edmonton, Alberta's Capital City. The local monolith is 10 feet tall, 250 pounds and made of galvanized steel. The monolith was made by Brent Siermachesky, the general manager at Alberta Custom Metal Fabricators, who said "this is just a little something to make people chuckle when they drive by and say, 'Hey look, we got one of those in Edmonton now too.

British Columbia 
On December 9, 2020, a monolith was discovered in Vancouver, which also resembles the monolith found in Utah.

On December 13, 2020, a monolith was discovered in Kamloops.

On December 23, 2020, a monolith appeared in the Willemar neighborhood of Courtenay, B.C.

Manitoba 
On December 7, 2020, another mysterious monolith was discovered in Manitoba near the Old Pinawa Dam between the cities of Pinawa and Lac du Bonnet which resembles the monolith found in Utah.

Ontario 
In mid-December 2020, a monolith appeared at the Rockway Vineyard Golf Course in St. Catharines.

On December 31, 2020, a monolith appeared at the Humber Bay Trail in Toronto. By sunrise on January 1, 2021 it was found vandalized with graffiti. The following day, residents scrubbed it clean to its original state.
On the morning of January 2, 2021, witnesses reported the monolith being removed by the city in a post on the Humber Bay Shores Discussion Facebook page, and that a new monolith had appeared East of the Humber Bay Arch Bridge on the breakwall on January 1.

Quebec 
On December 18, 2020, a monolith was discovered in Montreal, Quebec.

Saskatchewan 
On January 5, 2021, a monolith appeared in Saskatoon, Saskatchewan.

United States

Arkansas
On December 13, 2020, a 10 foot tall monolith was discovered by a local resident who was driving around the farmland in Eureka Springs, in which it was located. Although of unknown origin, the monolith has undergone much speculation, as the land it currently resides on hosts an annual alien-themed music festival. The owner of the venue claims all entrances and exits to the property are monitored by surveillance equipment; however, they never captured any visitor entering or exiting the campgrounds.

California
On December 2, 2020, a triangular reflective metal column was found on Pine Mountain in Atascadero, California. This appeared to be hollow and not secured to the ground. On December 4, three young men, from Orange County, referring to themselves as military veterans, livestreamed themselves destroying the monolith on DLive, replacing it with a large wooden cross and chanting "Christ is king!". Members of the group are also heard singing country songs, and were heard saying "we don't want illegal aliens from Mexico or outer space". The group's chants and slang suggest that they were part of the Groyper movement.

According to the local mayor, Heather Moreno, "We are upset that these young men felt the need to drive five hours to come into our community and vandalize the monolith ... The monolith was something unique and fun in an otherwise stressful time."

On December 5, a group of four artists (Wade McKenzie, Travis Kenney, Randall Kenney and Jared Riddle) declared that they were the creators of the original structure, and after it was toppled, decided to replace it with a new one. According to one of the artists, Wade McKenzie, "We intended for it to be a piece of guerrilla art. But when it was taken down in such a malicious manner, we decided we needed to replace it." The next day, the local deputy city manager, Terrie Banish, said that the city was "happy to see it return".

On December 5, 2020, a monolith was found in the Los Padres National Forest of San Luis Obispo County. This monolith resembles the monolith in Atascadero, but the structure's top features “CAUTION” written in red and a picture of a UFO, a beam and a human. Kenney and McKenzie denied any connection to this monolith, but thought it could be the same monolith taken from Pine Mountain since the original had never been recovered. The monolith was no longer there when visited on March 3, 2021.

On December 6, 2020, a monolith was found at Canyon Country Park in the city of Santa Clarita, but it was removed the next morning.

On December 8, 2020, a monolith was reported in a parking lot at Scripps Ranch Marketplace, San Diego. It was hauled away that night by an unidentified group.

On December 7, 2020, a monolith was found in Joshua Tree National Park.

On December 9, 2020, a monolith was found on the bank of Lake Tahoe on the California–Nevada border. It was later revealed to be a prank in which the monolith was installed, photographed, and removed in one day, then pictures were posted on social media.

On December 11, 2020, a monolith was found on Torrance Beach in Torrance, a city near Los Angeles. It was quickly removed by the Department of Beaches and Harbors.

On December 25, 2020, a "gingerbread monolith" appeared at Corona Heights Park in San Francisco. The structure was made of gingerbread with added frosting and gumdrops, and, although supported by plywood, collapsed the next day.

Colorado 
On December 4, 2020, a monolith appeared outside the Colorado Air and Space Port, northeast of Aurora. This monolith was not mysterious for long, however, as it was claimed by Bill Zempel, a mechanic at Mile High Aircraft Services.

On December 6, 2020, two separate monoliths were reported in Boulder. The first was found in Chatauqua Park, South Boulder. It quickly vanished and a second monolith was found outside of a taco restaurant in Boulder. The similarity and timing of the monoliths has led many to theorize that the same monolith was moved between the two sites.

Florida 
On December 13, 2020, a monolith was spotted at West Side Park in Gainesville.

On December 16, 2020, a monolith was discovered in Fort Pierce, on 2nd Street.

Georgia 
On December 14, 2020, a monolith was found in Newnan. The 7 foot tall triangular structure made of sheet metal was removed by local government officials the following day.

Kentucky 
On May 28, 2021,  a monolith was found in Franklin near the boat ramps on Drakes Creek.   The 8 foot tall triangular structure consists of thick stainless steel panels that are 16 inches wide.

Massachusetts 
On December 19, 2020, a monolith was found in Quincy at the Quarries. A crop-circle was etched in the snow around it. This monolith was stolen less than 24 hours after its appearance.

Michigan 
On December 8, 2020, a monolith was found in Lansing. This monolith had an inscription etched on it directing readers to the official website of the monolith.

On December 9, 2020, a monolith was found in Kentwood.

Missouri 
On December 26, 2020, a monolith Was found in Sedalia at Liberty Park. Source is unknown and unclaimed. The Liberty park monolith vanished unexplained on December 30.

Nebraska 
On December 3, 2020, a monolith was found in Holdrege. This monolith was revealed to have been built by the owner of a local welding company.

Nevada
In early December 2020, a monolith-type structure was found in Las Vegas.

New Mexico 
On December 7, 2020, a monolith was found outside Albuquerque. This monolith was later vandalized and shattered.

New York 
On December 15, 2020, a monolith was found in McDaniels Park in Ithaca.

North Carolina 
On December 3, 2020 a mini-monolith appeared in the center of Fayetteville. This monolith is similar in appearance to the others, but is only three feet tall. Later that day at 17:00, one of the public cameras showed one or several people in a white van which led to a local business called the Blashfield Sign company. When owner Matt Blashfield was asked about involvement with the monolith, he denied having anything to do with it.

Oregon 

On January 5, 2021, a monolith was found in the parking lot of the local Elks lodge in Hood River by Elks secretary Kara Tobin.

Pennsylvania 
On December 3, 2020, a monolith appeared outside Grandpa Joe's Candy Shop in Pittsburgh. This monolith was not mysterious like the others, as it was placed by the store owner, Chris Beers. Beers explained the monolith that day. He stated "I knew I could get a viral hit off of this. Yes, it's fake. I built it myself ... But the message is: Support small business. I just wanted to make people laugh and have fun and get a good kick out of it." Beers' monolith was stolen overnight on December 5, but was rebuilt by Beers the next day.

Texas 
In early December 2020, a monolith-type structure was found in El Paso.

On December 4, 2020, a monolith was found on the campus of Austin Community College in Austin. The structure was later revealed to have been built by the college's welding department. A photo collection of the installation is available on the college's website.

A pet adoption center in San Antonio, saw increased traffic to their website and for adoption appointments after one was anonymously placed on their property on December 3.

In January 2021, a metal monolith appeared next to a trail by the banks of the Trinity River in Fort Worth.  The mystery of its appearance was short-lived, however, as it was quickly revealed to be a stunt by local country music radio station KSCS with the help of high school students from nearby Millsap, Texas.

Utah 

On December 4, 2020, a monolith appeared in West Jordan, a suburb of Salt Lake City. This monolith did not remain mysterious for long, as it was claimed by a local steel manufacturer, Mountain Stainless Inc., as a marketing gimmick.

On April 3, 2021, Another monolith was found in the Three Peaks recreational area near Cedar City, Iron County, Utah. One major difference was that the monolith had a button on the east facing side that when pressed, would expose a container which had a metal piece with the eye of RA, the Egyptian sun God. This drawer dispensed strips of copper engraved seemingly the first piece of a puzzle: “HUMAN MAY 4TH | 37.3179604 | 114.9597835.” Further inspection showed that the monolith contained solar panels, which powered a Raspberry PI to control the monolith. This one was reported to have been vandalized, and had disappeared by late afternoon on April 5, 2021.

Vermont 
On December 12, 2020, a monolith was discovered by a hiker atop a mountain in the town of Pittsfield.

Washington, D.C. 
On December 6, 2020, a monolith appeared on the lawn of a family residence in the Hillcrest neighborhood of Washington D.C, while the home's residents were out on a walk.

Wisconsin 
On January 3, 2021, a monolith appeared on the Milwaukee County Grounds in Wauwatosa, Wisconsin.

Oceania

Australia

South Australia

On December 10, 2020, a monolith was discovered along the Seaford railway line, just south of the Noarlunga Centre in Adelaide, South Australia. The monolith has four separate coordinates marked on the side. It is believed to be erected separate from the YouTube group who filmed themselves erecting a monolith outside of Melbourne. The coordinates appear to be (from top to bottom): (40.7624N, 73.9738W), (15.2413973N, 145.7122932E), (17.75N, 142.5E), (29.97N, 31.1375E). The second coordinate is based on the news report; it is hard to make out from photos and thus can't be verified without a clear photo. These coordinates point approximately to: (1) Trump Tower, New York City, New York, USA, (2) Managaha Island, North Mariana Islands, (3) The Mariana Trench (NW of Managaha Island), (4) The Sphinx in Giza, Egypt. This monolith was replaced with three metal rebar poles/stakes. The 3 clear coordinates point in a straight line from Trump Tower to the Sphinx to the Mariana Trench (with the less clear coordinate of Managaha Island being near the Mariana Trench).

Victoria
In early December 2020, Australian comedy group Aunty Donna teamed up with the YouTubers behind the channel "I Did a Thing" and erected a monolith on the outskirts of Melbourne, in an effort to promote their Netflix series Aunty Donna's Big Ol' House of Fun.

New Zealand 
On December 20, 2020, a monolith was discovered at the Christchurch Adventure Park.

Central America and the Caribbean

Panama 
On December 7, 2020, a monolith structure was found in Panama City, outside of JW Marriott Panama.

The Bahamas 
On December 18, 2020, a monolith was discovered on Jolly Hall beach in the district of Exuma.

South America

Bolivia 
On December 16, 2020, a monolith appeared near the La Pajcha waterfall in the department of Santa Cruz. Each of the 4 sides shows engraved scriptures in different languages, including: Mandarin, Russian, Hebrew and Arabic. The following day the monolith disappeared leaving only a metal frame behind.

Colombia 
On December 8, 2020, a gold-colored monolith appeared in the municipality of Chía in the department of Cundinamarca.

Paraguay 
On December 11, 2020, a metal monolith appeared in the city of Paraguari, it was later removed by local policemen.

Middle East

Iran 
On December 14, 2020, a monolith appeared on top of a valley in Niknam-Deh, a small village approximately 15 kilometers east of Tehran. The monolith is 3 meters in height and has been engraved with the letters "N" and "S", representing the directions north and south respectively.

See also 

 Minimalism (visual arts)
 Monolith on planet Mars
 Monolith on Mars moon
 Pop art
 
 Site-specific art
 Trail ethics

References

External links 
 Monolith Tracker Creative Commons Website
  – ABC News, November 24, 2020.
 Official BLMUtah Facebook Comments re Missing Monolith, November 29, 2020.
 Bureau of Land Management – Utah. "Illegally Installed Structure aka the 'monolith'". Flickr.

Aluminium sculptures
Internet memes introduced in 2020
Open problems
Works of uncertain authorship
Utah monolith
2020s fads and trends
monolith
Monoliths